Global Wars 2018 was a professional wrestling tour co-produced by the American Ring of Honor (ROH) and Japanese New Japan Pro-Wrestling (NJPW) promotions. The tour's four events took place on November 7 at the Androscoggin Bank Colisee in Lewiston, Maine, November 8 at Lowell Memorial Auditorium in Lowell, Massachusetts, November 9 at Buffalo RiverWorks in Buffalo, New York and November 11 at Mattamy Athletic Centre in Toronto, Ontario, Canada. This was the fifth year in which ROH and NJPW co-produced shows under the Global Wars name.

Matches

Global Wars: Lewiston

Global Wars: Lowell

Global Wars: Buffalo

Global Wars: Toronto

See also
2018 in professional wrestling

References

External links
Official New Japan Pro-Wrestling website 
Official Ring of Honor website

2018 in professional wrestling
2017
Events in Lowell, Massachusetts
Events in Buffalo, New York
Events in Toronto
Professional wrestling in Toronto
Professional wrestling in Massachusetts
November 2018 events in the United States
Professional wrestling in Buffalo, New York
Professional wrestling in Maine
2018 Ring of Honor pay-per-view events
Sports in Lewiston, Maine